Murray Kevin "Moe" Berg (born March 22, 1959) is a Canadian singer, guitarist, songwriter, and record producer best known as the frontman of The Pursuit of Happiness.

Biography
Before forming The Pursuit of Happiness, Berg was in the Edmonton bands Troc '59, The News, Modern Minds and Facecrime.

After working with The Pursuit of Happiness for ten years, Berg released his first solo album, Summer's Over, in 1997. He has also produced a number of records for other artists. He currently plays rhythm in the 1980s cover band "Monteforte".

Berg has been published as a writer, releasing his first book, a short story collection called The Green Room, in 2000 (Gutter Press). He has also written book reviews for Amazon.ca, the Edmonton Journal, The Globe and Mail, among articles for other publications.

He currently works mainly as a record producer for young bands such as The Cliks.

In 2009, Berg began co-hosting a television show, Master Tracks, on Aux.  The show is a documentary look at the recording process of emerging bands attempting to record a song in one day in a professional recording studio. The show's first season is currently airing on Aux and is in post production for its second season.

Berg also works as a professor teaching music production for the Music Industry Arts Program at Fanshawe College in London, Ontario.

Berg is the cousin of Edmonton radio host Rob Berg from Edmonton classic rock station K97.

Berg lives in Toronto, Ontario with his wife Laura and his two sons, Fireese and Hartford.

2017, Touring Canada as part of The Trans-Canada Highwaymen with Chris Murphy (Sloan), Steven Page (Barenaked Ladies) and Craig Northey (Odds). The group played their first show in Niagara in July 2016.

Articles
 Book review of For Those About To Rock by Dave Bidini
 Book review of Coke Machine Glow by Gordon Downie

References

External links
 Moe Berg Interview on Rundgren Radio 2020
Moe Berg on Myspace
Maple Music: Moe Berg/TPOH bio
 The Ruckus – Audio Interview with Moe Berg from July 2009
 Moe Berg Interview on Rundgren Radio 2008
 Moe Berg Interview from 2007
 
 

1959 births
Living people
Canadian indie rock musicians
Canadian male singers
Canadian male singer-songwriters
Canadian people of Swedish descent
Canadian record producers
Canadian rock singers
Canadian male short story writers
Canadian singer-songwriters
Musicians from Edmonton
Writers from Edmonton
21st-century Canadian short story writers
21st-century Canadian male writers